William, Bill or Billy Nolan may refer to:

 William Nolan (bishop) (born 1954), Bishop of Galloway, Scotland
 William F. Nolan (1928–2021), American author of science fiction, fantasy and horror
 William I. Nolan (1874–1943), U.S. representative from Minnesota
 William T. Nolan (1887–1969), Canadian-born architect who worked in New Orleans, Louisiana
 Bill Nolan (animator) (1894–1954), Irish-American animated cartoon writer, animator, director, and artist
 Bill Nolan (footballer, born 1888) (1888–1916), Australian rules footballer for Richmond
 Bill Nolan (footballer, born 1927) (1927–2002), Australian rules footballer for Collingwood
 Bill Nolan (footballer, born 1929), Australian rules footballer for South Melbourne
 Billy Nolan (character), fictional character in Carrie
 Billy Nolan (hurler), Irish hurler